Rawdat Al Jahhaniya is a district in Qatar, located in the municipality of Al Rayyan. It is accessible through Dukhan Highway by road and Al Riffa station by rail. The district is one of the areas in Qatar which allows freehold ownership by foreigners.

It is bordered to the east by Al Seej, Al Themaid, and Rawdat Egdaim, to the north by Jeryan Al Saham, to the west and north-west by Jery Al Dabi, and to the south by Umm Al Jawashen. The Mall of Qatar is found here.

Developments
The formerly undeveloped area was chosen as the site to build a new commercial and sports hub for Al Rayyan west of Sports City in Baaya. Aside from the Mall of Qatar, which constitutes Qatar's largest shopping mall, and the new Al Rayyan Stadium, the area is expected to host several sports fields, a hospital, a metro station, a large park and a wedding hall.

Transport
The elevated Al Riffa station currently serves as the western terminus the Green Line of the Doha Metro. The station was opened to the public on 10 December 2019 along with the other Green Line stations. It is located on Dukhan Highway, opposite of the Mall of Qatar.

The station currently has no metrolinks. Facilities on the premises include restrooms and a prayer room.

Gallery

References

Populated places in Al Rayyan